Acceleration Team Mexico is the Mexican team of Formula Acceleration 1, an international racing series. At the inaugural round in Portimao, they entered two cars - one run by the RC Motorsport team, owned by Rocco Peduzzi and E. Catella, and the other run by NBC Motorsport.

History

2014 season 
Drivers: Luis Michael Dörrbecker, Picho Toledano

The team announced Luis Michael Dörrbecker and Picho Toledano as their drivers for the inaugural Formula Acceleration 1 round in Portimao. Dörrbecker was entered in the RC Motorsport-run car and Toledano in the NBC Motorsport-run car. However, Toledano did not run in any sessions and withdrew from the weekend due to electrical system problems.

Drivers

Complete Formula Acceleration 1 Results

References 

Mexico
National sports teams of Mexico
Mexican auto racing teams